Charles Waterhouse is the name of:

Charles Owen Waterhouse (1843–1917), English entomologist
Charles Waterhouse (artist) (1924–2013), American painter, illustrator and sculptor
Charles Waterhouse (British politician) (1893–1975), Conservative Member of Parliament 1924–1945 and 1950–1957
Charles Waterhouse (hotelier), founder of Deerhurst Resort